The Pennsylvania Society of Miniature Painters was founded in 1901 by Emily Drayton Taylor to promote the work of miniature portrait painters of Pennsylvania. It held exhibits from 1901-1951 at the Pennsylvania Academy of Fine Arts.

Taylor served as its president from 1901 until 1951.  Anna Margaretta Archambault was the secretary of the society for many years.

References

Art societies
1901 establishments in Pennsylvania